Room Hire Co (Pty) Ltd v Jeppe Street Mansions (Pty) Ltd is an important case in South African law: the leading case, indeed, on disputes of fact. It was heard in the Transvaal Provincial Division on April 28 and 29, 1949, with judgement on July 15. Murray AJP, Ramsbottom J and Blackwell J presided. A. Shacksonvis KC (with him A. Mendelow) appeared for the appellant, and A. Suzman KC (with him MJ Hart) for the respondent. The appellant's attorneys were Schwartz & Goldblatt; the respondent's were Podlashuc, Meintjes, Liebson & Klagsbrun.

The case was an appeal from a decision in the Witwatersrand Local Division by Neser J. Its significance lies in the area of civil procedure, with its determination that the court in application proceedings, where a material fact arises which cannot be resolved by viva voce evidence, may either direct the parties to trial or dismiss the application with costs.

Judgment 
Ramsbottom J and Blackwell J concurred in the judgment of Murray AJP, who reiterated that, except in interlocutory matters, it is undesirable to attempt to settle disputes of fact solely on the probabilities disclosed in contradictory affidavits. Where no real dispute of fact exists, there is no reason for incurring the delay and expense involved in a trial action: Motion proceedings in such a case are generally recognised as permissible.

Where a dispute of fact is shown to exist, however, the court has a discretion as to the future course of the proceedings. If the dispute of fact cannot properly be determined by viva voce evidence under Rule 9, the parties may be sent to trial in the ordinary way (either on the affidavits as constituting the pleadings, or else with a direction that pleadings be filed); otherwise the application may be dismissed with costs.

See also 
 Civil procedure in South Africa
 Law of South Africa
 Motion (legal)

References 
 Afrimeric Distributors (Pty) Ltd v EI Rogoff 1948 (1) SA 569.
 Cowley v Estate Loumeau 1925 AD 392.
 Frank v Ohlsson's Cape Breweries Ltd 1924 AD 289.
 Mohamed v Malk 1930 TPD 615.
 Nel v Abrams & Sloot 1911 TPD 24.
 Peterson v Cuthbert & Co Ltd 1945 AD 420.
 R Bakers (Pty), Ltd v Ruto Bakeries (Pty), Ltd 1948 (2) SA 626 (T).
 Room Hire Co (Pty) Ltd v Jeppe Street Mansions (Pty) Ltd 1949 (3) SA 1155 (T).
 Saperstein v Venter's Assignee (1929) 14 PH A71 (T).
 Williams v Tunstall 1949 (3) SA 835 (T).

Notes 

1949 in South African law
1949 in case law
Transvaal Provincial Division cases